Under the Whyte notation for the classification of steam locomotives, 0-2-4 represents the wheel arrangement of no leading wheels, two powered driving wheels on one axle, and four trailing wheels on two axles.

History

This is a most unusual wheel arrangement, with the only known examples being three locomotives supplied to the 4ft 6in Dundee and Newtyle Railway by J and C Carmichael of Dundee in 1833. These were still in operation in 1847, but may have been scrapped in 1849 when the line was converted to the standard gauge.

References

2,0-2-4